Mahlon Clark (March 7, 1923 – September 20, 2007) was an American musician who was a member of the Lawrence Welk orchestra from 1962 to 1968. His primary instrument was the clarinet.

Born and raised in Portsmouth, Virginia, Clark started out in vaudeville as a child. Later as a teenager, he became a big band musician playing for the Ray McKinley and Will Bradley bands, among others. Relocating to California during World War II, after serving in the armed forces, found employment at Paramount Pictures where he performed music on many movie soundtracks.

He was hired by Welk in 1962 to join his orchestra and his television show. For six years, he played both the clarinet and saxophone for a weekly national television audience and on stage when the Musical Family went out on tour. He was replaced by reedman Dave Edwards before the new TV taping sessions in 1968.  After leaving the Welk organization, Clark continued to perform on many more movie soundtracks and with numerous artists such as Frank Sinatra and Madonna.

Personal life
He was married twice, first to big band vocalist Imogene Lynn, whom he met while with Ray McKinley's band and later to Kathy Lennon of the Lennon Sisters.

Discography

With Louis Bellson
Louis Bellson Swings Jule Styne (Verve, 1960)
 Clarinetist for "Members of the Benny Goodman Orchestra" recordings for Crown Records 1960s-late 1970s.

References

External links
Mahlon Clark on allmusic.com

Chicago Tribune obituary

1923 births
2007 deaths
American clarinetists
Musicians from Portsmouth, Virginia
Woodrow Wilson High School (Portsmouth, Virginia) alumni
Vaudeville performers
20th-century American musicians
Lawrence Welk